Ischnocraspedus is a genus of moths in the family Gelechiidae. It contains the species Ischnocraspedus peracuta, which is found in South Africa.

The wingspan is 11–13 mm. The forewings are yellow-ochreous, sometimes tinged with grey posteriorly. The costal edge is white on the basal third. The hindwings are grey.

References

Endemic moths of South Africa
Anomologinae